Samuelu Malo (born 4 April 1999) is a Samoan footballer who plays as a midfielder for Vailima Kiwi FC and the Samoa national football team. He made his debut for the national team at the 2016 OFC Nations Cup on May 29, 2016 in their 4–0 loss against Tahiti.

In January 2019 he was selected for Vailima Kiwi's team to contest the 2019 OFC Champions League.

In May 2018 he was selected for the Samoa national under-20 football team for the 2018 OFC U-19 Championship. In September 2019 he was selected for the Samoa national under-23 football team for the 2019 OFC Men's Olympic Qualifying Tournament.

References

External links
 
 

Living people
1999 births
Samoan footballers
Samoa under-20 international footballers
Samoa international footballers
Association football midfielders
2016 OFC Nations Cup players
Samoa youth international footballers